The 1925 Penn Quakers football team was an American football team that represented the University of Pennsylvania as an independent during the 1925 college football season. In its third season under head coach Lou Young, the team compiled a 7–2 record and outscored opponents by a total of 165 to 64. Joseph Putnam Willson was the team captain. The team played its home games at Franklin Field in Philadelphia.

Schedule

References

Penn
Penn Quakers football seasons
Penn Quakers football